The 1975 Northern Michigan Wildcats football team represented Northern Michigan University during the 1975 NCAA Division II football season.  Led by second-year head coach Gil Krueger, the Wildcats compiled a  record, with victories over Central Michigan (17–16), Nebraska–Omaha (41–14), Youngstown State (15–0), Eastern Michigan (20–7), and Boise State (24–21) in Idaho in the quarterfinals of the Division II playoffs.

The Wildcats defeated the Western Kentucky in the championship game, 16–14, to win their first Division II national title. The championship game was held at Hughes Stadium in Sacramento, California. Of all current members of Division II, as of 2013, Northern Michigan was the first to win the playoff national championship.

The 1975 team was led by sophomore quarterback Steve Mariucci, later a head coach in the NFL for nine seasons. The previous season in 1974, the Wildcats were winless at

Schedule

References

Northern Michigan
Northern Michigan Wildcats football seasons
NCAA Division II Football Champions
Northern Michigan Football